Alberto Miguel Martínez Mireles (born 29 September 1950) is a Mexican politician affiliated with the National Action Party. As of 2014 he served as Senator of the LVIII and LIX Legislatures of the Mexican Congress representing San Luis Potosí and as Deputy of the LV Legislature.

References

1950 births
Living people
Politicians from San Luis Potosí
People from San Luis Potosí City
Members of the Senate of the Republic (Mexico)
Members of the Chamber of Deputies (Mexico)
National Action Party (Mexico) politicians
20th-century Mexican politicians
21st-century Mexican politicians
Autonomous University of San Luis Potosi alumni